The Yehudiya Forest Reserve is a nature reserve in the central Golan Heights. With the area of 134 sq. km, it is the largest reserve in the Golans. The height differential of its landscape - from 200 meters below the sea level to 600 meters above - provides for high waterfalls. It is named after the ancient village of Yehudiya, one of many archaeological sites located within the reserve. Due to the varied scenery of streams, gorges with waterfalls, woodlands, rich wildlife, and volcanic basalt landscape it is a popular tourist destination in Israel. 

It is located between Katsrin in the north east and Bethsaida (north of the Sea of Galilee) in the south west, and between Road 888 in the west (Bethsaida junction – Customs House Junction) and the borders of the Gamla nature reserve and Road 869 in the south. Road 87 from Yehudiya Junction to Katsrin South Junction crosses it.

Most of the area are covered by basalt strata. In many places there are hexagonal basalt columns.

A part of the reserve (south of Yehudiya River towards the Daliyot River) is a training area for the Israeli Defense Forces, which sometimes causes fires.

The Yehudiya forest area covers 66 square kilometers. It is rather sparse and trees cover about 10% of the woodland, and the rest is savanna-like landscape. The most prevalent tree is Quercus ithaburensis (Mount Tabor Oak).

The reserve is abundant in water sources. Most important rivers (streams) are Meshushim, Zavitan, Yehudiya, Gamla, and Daliyot.

References

Nature reserves in Israeli-occupied territories
Golan Heights